Nafisa Shah (born 20 January 1968) is a Pakistani politician who has been a member of the National Assembly of Pakistan, since August 2018. Previously, she was member of the National Assembly from March 2008 to May 2018.

Early life and education
Shah was born on 20 January 1968 in Khairpur, Sindh to Qaim Ali Shah.

She has doctorate in Social and Cultural Anthropology from the University of Oxford.

Political career
Shah served as Nazim of District Khairpur from 2001 to 2007.

She was elected to the National Assembly of Pakistan on a reserved seat for women as a candidate of Pakistan Peoples Party (PPP) from Sindh in the 2008 Pakistani general election. She served as chair of the National Commission for Human Development and general secretary of the Women's Parliamentary Caucus between 2008 and 2013.

She has been vice president of the Commonwealth Parliamentary Association. She also headed the National Commission for Human Development. In 2011, she was awarded a Ph.D degree by the University of Oxford for her study on honour killing in Sindh.

She was re-elected to the National Assembly as a candidate of PPP on a seat reserved for women from Sindh in the 2013 Pakistani general election for the second time.

She was re-elected to the National Assembly as a candidate of PPP from Constituency NA-208 (Khairpur-I) in 2018 Pakistani general election. She received 107,847 votes and defeated Ghous Ali Shah.

books
Honour Unmasked: Gender Violence, Law, and Power in Pakistan  – 2016
 Honour and Violence: Gender, Power and Law in Southern Pakistan. 2017

References

1968 births
Sindhi people
Pakistan People's Party MNAs
Living people
Women mayors of places in Pakistan
Alumni of the University of Oxford
Mayors of places in Pakistan
Karachi Grammar School alumni
Women members of the National Assembly of Pakistan
Pakistani MNAs 2008–2013
Pakistani MNAs 2013–2018
Pakistani MNAs 2018–2023
St Joseph's Convent School, Karachi alumni
21st-century Pakistani women politicians